Didier Pasgrimaud (23 February 1966 – 28 January 2021) was a French cyclist. He competed in the team pursuit event at the 1988 Summer Olympics.

References

External links
 

1966 births
2021 deaths
French male cyclists
Olympic cyclists of France
Cyclists at the 1988 Summer Olympics
People from Châteaubriant
French track cyclists
Cyclists from Loire-Atlantique